The 1983 Oyo State gubernatorial election occurred on August 13, 1983. NPN's Victor Omololu Olunloyo won election for a first term, defeating main opposition UPN candidate, Bola Ige, and other party candidates in the contest.

Victor Omololu Olunloyo emerged winner in the NPN gubernatorial primary election. His running mate was Olatunji Mohammed.

Electoral system
The Governor of Oyo State is elected using the plurality voting system.

Results
There were five parties registered by the Federal Electoral Commission (FEDECO). The NPN candidate, Victor Omololu Olunloyo, was announced by the returning officer, Daniel Adopoju Lapade Laniran, to have defeated the Incumbent Governor, UPN's Bola Ige to win the contest. There was a total of 3,004,715 vote cast.

References 

Oyo State gubernatorial elections
Gubernatorial election 1983
Oyo State gubernatorial election